Ubiquitin-conjugating enzyme E2 E1 is a protein that in humans is encoded by the UBE2E1 gene.

Function 

The modification of proteins with ubiquitin is an important cellular mechanism for targeting abnormal or short-lived proteins for degradation. Ubiquitination involves at least three classes of enzymes: ubiquitin-activating enzymes, or E1s, ubiquitin-conjugating enzymes, or E2s, and ubiquitin-protein ligases, or E3s. This gene encodes a member of the E2 ubiquitin-conjugating enzyme family. Two alternatively spliced transcript variants encoding distinct isoforms have been found for this gene.

Interactions 

UBE2E1 has been shown to interact with Ataxin 1 and NEDD4.

References

Further reading

External links 
 PDBe-KB provides an overview of all the structure information available in the PDB for Human Ubiquitin-conjugating enzyme E2 E1 (UBE2E1)